Mastromarino is an Italian surname. Notable people with the surname include:

 Mariano Mastromarino (born 1982), Argentine athlete
 Michael Mastromarino (died 2013), American illegal body parts harvester
 Michele Mastromarino (1894–1986), Italian gymnast

Italian-language surnames